In complexity theory, computational problems that are co-NP-complete are those that are the hardest problems in co-NP, in the sense that any problem in co-NP can be reformulated as a special case of any co-NP-complete problem with only polynomial overhead. If P is different from co-NP, then all of the co-NP-complete problems are not solvable in polynomial time. If there exists a way to solve a co-NP-complete problem quickly, then that algorithm can be used to solve all co-NP problems quickly.

Each co-NP-complete problem is the complement of an NP-complete problem.  There are some problems in both NP and co-NP, for example all problems in P or integer factorization. However, it is not known if the sets are equal, although inequality is thought more likely. See co-NP and NP-complete for more details.

Fortune showed in 1979 that if any sparse language is co-NP-complete (or even just co-NP-hard), then , a critical foundation for Mahaney's theorem.

Formal definition
A decision problem C is co-NP-complete if it is in co-NP and if every problem in co-NP is polynomial-time many-one reducible to it. This means that for every co-NP problem L, there exists a polynomial time algorithm which can transform any instance of L into an instance of C with the same truth value. As a consequence, if we had a polynomial time algorithm for C, we could solve all co-NP problems in polynomial time.

Example
One example of a co-NP-complete problem is tautology, the problem of determining whether a given Boolean formula is a tautology; that is, whether every possible assignment of true/false values to variables yields a true statement. This is closely related to the Boolean satisfiability problem, which asks whether there exists at least one such assignment, and is NP-complete.

References

External links 
 

Complexity classes